Marco Simonelli (born 28 February 2000) is an Italian professional footballer who plays as a midfielder for Flaminia.

Club career
Formed in Savio Calcio youth sector, Simonelli joined to Serie C club Viterbese in 2019. He extended his contract with the club in March 2020.

On 31 January 2022, Simonelli was loaned to Fermana.

On 20 January 2023, Simonelli moved to Serie D club Flaminia.

References

External links
 
 

2000 births
Living people
Footballers from Rome
Italian footballers
Association football midfielders
Serie C players
U.S. Viterbese 1908 players
Fermana F.C. players